The uncertain geographic context problem (UGCoP) is a source of statistical bias that can significantly impact the results of spatial analysis when dealing with aggregate data. The UGCoP is very closely related to the Modifiable areal unit problem (MAUP), and like the MAUP, arises from how we divide the land into areal units. It is caused by the difficulty, or impossibility, of understanding how phenomena under investigation (such as people within a census tract) in different enumeration units interact between enumeration units, and outside of a study area over time. It is particularly important to consider the UGCoP within the discipline of time geography, where phenomena under investigation can move between spatial enumeration units during the study period. Examples of research that needs to consider the UGCoP include food access and human mobility.

Introduction

The uncertain geographic context problem, or UGCoP, was first coined by Dr. Mei-Po Kwan in 2012. The problem is highly related to the ecological fallacy, edge effect, and Modifiable areal unit problem (MAUP) in that, it relates to aggregate units as they apply to individuals. The crux of the problem is that the boundaries we use for aggregation are arbitrary and may not represent the actual neighborhood of the individuals within them. While a particular enumeration unit, such as a census tract, contains a person's location, they may work, go to school, and shop in completely different areas. The geographic phenomena under investigation may extend beyond the delineated boundary if a boundary can be crossed. Different individuals, or groups of individuals, may have completely different activity spaces, making an enumeration unit that works for one person meaningless to another. For example, a map using school districts as a means of aggregation will be more meaningful when studying a population of students than the general population. Traditional spatial analysis, by necessity, treats each discrete areal unit as a self-contained neighborhood and does not consider the daily activity of crossing the boundaries.

The UGCoP has further implications when considering the area outside of a study area. Tobler's second law of geography states, "the phenomenon external to a geographic area of interest affects what goes on inside." As a study area is often a subset of the planet, data on the edges of the study area will be excluded. If the boundary demarcating the study area is permeable to travel, then the phenomena under investigation within it may extend beyond, and be impacted by, forces excluded from the analysis. This uncertainty contributes to the UGCoP.

Implications 
All maps are wrong, and a cartographer must ensure that their maps' limitations are well documented to avoid misleading the users.  With modern technology, there is an emphasis on individual-level data and understanding how individuals interact with their environment.  When making maps with this individual-level data, the UGCoP is one source of bias that can impact the results of an analysis.  When these results inform policy, they can have real world ramifications.

The UGCoP is particularly important when understanding food access and human mobility.

Suggested solutions 
Geographic information systems, along with technologies that can monitor the position of individuals in real time, are possible methods for addressing the UGCoP. These technologies allow scientists to analyze and visualize the 3D space-time path of people moving through a study area, and better understand their actual activity space. Web GIS has also been employed to address the UGCoP by allowing researchers to better contextualize subjects' real and perceived activity space. These technologies have helped to address the problem by moving away from aggregate data and introducing a temporal component to the modeling of subject activity.

See also

 Arbia's law of geography
 At-location mapping
 Automotive navigation system
 Collaborative mapping
 Concepts and Techniques in Modern Geography
 Counter-mapping
 Distributed GIS
 Geographic information systems in geospatial intelligence
 GIS and aquatic science
 GIS and public health
 GIS in archaeology
 Historical GIS
 Integrated Geo Systems
 List of GIS data sources
 List of GIS software
 Map database management
 Participatory GIS
 QGIS
 Technical geography
 Tobler's first law of geography
 Tobler's second law of geography
 Traditional knowledge GIS
 Virtual globe

References

Bias
Geographic information systems
Problems in spatial analysis